ONGC-GAIL Delhi Open is now known as Delhi Open. The first edition of this tournament was held in 2014. The category of Men's singles of this tournament (2014 ONGC–GAIL Delhi Open men's singles) was won by Somdev Devvarman. He defeated Aleksandr Nedovyesov in the final, 6-3, 6-1. Though Aleksandr started playing the tournament being the number one seed. Yet, he had been defeated by the number 2 seed of the tournament.

Seeds

Draw

Finals

Top half

Bottom half

External links
 Main Draw
 Qualifying Draw

ONGC-GAIL Delhi Open - Men's Singles
ONGC-GAIL Delhi Open - Men's Singles